Tomáš Hedera (born November 7, 1998) is a Slovak professional ice hockey defenceman currently playing for HC Nové Zámky of the Tipsport Liga.

Hedera previously played 14 games in the Kontinental Hockey League for HC Slovan Bratislava. He represented Slovakia at the 2018 World Junior Ice Hockey Championships.

References

External links

 

1998 births
Living people
HC 07 Detva players
HC Nové Zámky players
Slovak ice hockey defencemen
HC Slovan Bratislava players
Ice hockey people from Bratislava